The men's 1968 United States Olympic trials for track and field were a two-tiered event.  Athletes first met for semi-final Olympic trials in Los Angeles, from June 29 to 30. The final trials were held following a training camp at a specially constructed track at Echo Summit, California, between September 6–16.  This was called the most bizarre location for an Olympic trials ever, selected to mimic the nearly identical high altitude location for the Olympics in Mexico City in October.

An all-weather polyurethane Tartan track, similar to the Olympic venue, was constructed for the men's trials at Echo Summit, west of South Lake Tahoe.

After training at Echo Summit, the race walk trials was held at a similar high altitude location of Alamosa, Colorado, 20 kilometers on September 7, and 50 km on September 10.  The process was organized by the AAU, and the athletes invited to the finals were selected based on the qualification at the semi-Olympic trials.

The AccuTrak photographic fully automatic timing system was used at this meet, in anticipation of its implementation at the Olympics.  Fully automatic timing became mandatory for world records in 1977.  Administrators had not yet figured out what to do with the slower automatic times so the world records at this meet were set using hand times.

The women's Olympic trials were held separately under less elegant, low altitude conditions at Hilmer Lodge Stadium on the Mt. San Antonio College campus in Walnut, California.  The pentathlon took place in Columbia, Missouri during the AAU Championships.  Both meets took place on August 24 and 25.  The tight schedule also made doubling in individual events more difficult.  American resident, but Taiwanese citizen Chi Cheng was allowed to participate in the pentathlon, but her dominant performance did not displace the American athletes in the trials.

Men's results
Key:
.
All events considered to be held at high altitude.

Men track events

Men field events

Women's results

Women track events

Women field events

References

US Olympic Trials
Track, Outdoor
United States Olympic Trials (track and field)
Olympic Trials (track and field)
United States Summer Olympics Trials